A trust company is a company that specializes in the creation and administration of legal arrangements known as trusts.

It can also refer to:
Trust Company (band)
Trust Company, predecessor to SunTrust Banks

See also
Trust (business)